Pezotettix is a genus of 'short-horned grasshoppers' belonging to the family Acrididae subfamily Pezotettiginae (similar to and previously placed in the Catantopinae).

Distribution
The species belonging to this genus are present in most of Europe, in the Near East and in North Africa.

Species
Species within this genus include:
Pezotettix anatolica Uvarov, 1934
Pezotettix cotti Dirsh, 1949
Pezotettix curvicerca Uvarov, 1934
Pezotettix cypria Dirsh, 1949
Pezotettix giornae Rossi, 1794 - type species (as Gryllus giornae Rossi)
Pezotettix judaica Uvarov, 1934
Pezotettix lagoi Jannone, 1936
Pezotettix platycerca Stål, 1876
Pezotettix sorbinii Massa & Fontana, 1998

References

External links

Acrididae
Orthoptera of Africa
Orthoptera of Europe